Lucjan Hipolit Siemieński (13 August 1807 in Kamienna Góra near Żółkiew – 27 November 1877 in Kraków) was a Polish Romantic poet, prose writer, translator and literary critic.

See also
List of Poles

External links

Podania i legendy polskie, ruskie i litewskie L. Siemieńskiego online 
  

1807 births
1877 deaths
Polish male writers
People from Lviv Oblast
Polish male poets
November Uprising participants
Polish literary critics
Polish translators
Academic staff of Jagiellonian University
Participants of the Slavic Congress in Prague 1848